Michael Ofosu Appiah (born 29 December 1989) is a Ghanaian footballer who plays for Narva Trans as a centre-back.

Career
Born in Accra, Appiah started his football career at Ajax Football Academy (Kumasi) in Ghana in 2002 as central defender. He played in Ghana national under-17 football team after a call-up in a tournament. He was then promoted to the senior side of Ashanti Gold S.C. and played in 2005–06 Ghana Premier League.

At the end of his first season he got transferred to Accra base team Heart of Lions in 2006–07, and was called to the national U23 team afterwards. He was transferred from Heart of Lions to a major club in Ghana, Asante Kotoko SC for three seasons. He was asked to join Ghana Black Stars for participation during Chan tournament. He moved to South Africa, where he played for Jomo Cosmos for two seasons.

He moved to Latvia thereupon and played for Skonto FC for three seasons. He played for Estonian side FC Infonet.

On 19 June 2019, Appiah joined Valmieras FK.

On 31 January 2020, Appiah joined Narva Trans.

On August 1, 2021, Appiah became a free agent and is now without a club.

Career stats

International
In 2009, Ofosu Appiah played for the Black Stars, the Ghana national football team against Argentina in a friendly international match.

Statistics accurate as of match played 30 September 2009.

References

External links

1989 births
Living people
Association football defenders
Ghanaian footballers
Ashanti Gold SC players
Heart of Lions F.C. players
Asante Kotoko S.C. players
Jomo Cosmos F.C. players
Skonto FC players
FCI Tallinn players
FK RFS players
FK Liepāja players
Valmieras FK players
Meistriliiga players
Latvian Higher League players
South African Premier Division players
Ghanaian expatriate footballers
Expatriate soccer players in South Africa
Expatriate footballers in Estonia
Expatriate footballers in Latvia
Ghanaian expatriate sportspeople in South Africa
Ghanaian expatriate sportspeople in Estonia
Ghanaian expatriate sportspeople in Latvia
Ghana international footballers
Ghana A' international footballers
2009 African Nations Championship players